Moraru may refer to:

Moraru (surname), a Romanian-language surname meaning "miller" 
Moraru River, in Romania